Elizabeta Burg (born 1 October 1993) is a Croatian model and beauty pageant titleholder who was crowned Miss Universe Croatia 2012 and represented her country in Miss Universe 2012.

Early life 
Burg is Senior School of Public Health Dr. of Medical and Veterinary School in FC.

Miss Hrvatske 2011 
Elizabeta Burg competed for the title of Miss Hrvatske for Miss World in 2011 but failed to place in the top three.

Miss Universe Hrvatske 2012 
Elizabeta Burg has been crowned Miss Universe Hrvatske 2012 at the grand finale of Miss Universe Hrvatske 2012, at the Crystal Ballroom of the Westin Hotel in Zagreb on 1 April 2012.
She represented Croatia in Miss Universe 2012 which was held in Las Vegas on December 19 and placed in the top 16 at 11th place.

References

External links
Official Miss Universe Hrvatske website

1993 births
Living people
Croatian people of German descent
Miss Universe 2012 contestants
Croatian beauty pageant winners